Spencer Segura is an American former professional tennis player. He is the first born child of Ecuadorian-American tennis player Pancho Segura, from his marriage to Virginia Smith.

Segura played collegiate tennis for the UCLA Bruins and served as team captain in 1974. 

On the professional tour he had a best singles ranking of 193 and featured in the main draw of the 1975 Australian Open. He also made doubles main draw appearances at the French Open and US Open. One of his doubles partners was close friend Jimmy Connors, who was coached by Pancho Segura.

References

External links
 
 

Year of birth missing (living people)
Living people
American male tennis players
UCLA Bruins men's tennis players
American people of Ecuadorian descent
Sportspeople of Ecuadorian descent